Kirin is a village in central Croatia, in the municipality of Gvozd, Sisak-Moslavina County. It is connected by the D6 highway.

History
Kirin Republic (Croatian: Kirinska republika) was established on 2 August 1941.

Demographics
According to the 2011 census, the village of Kirin has 52 inhabitants. This represents 16.25% of its pre-war population according to the 1991 census.

According to the 1991 census,  98.75% of the village population were ethnic Serbs (316/320),  0.31% were ethnic Croats (1/320), while 0.94% were of other ethnic origin (3/320).

Notable natives and residents
 Mile Novaković

References 

Populated places in Sisak-Moslavina County
Serb communities in Croatia